The Red Moon (القمر الأحمر) is a 2013 Moroccan drama film directed by Hassan Benjelloun. It was selected as the Moroccan entry for the Best Foreign Language Film at the 87th Academy Awards, but was not nominated.

Cast
 Fattah Ngadi
 Fatine Hilal Bik
 Wassila Sobhi
 Fatim Zahra Benacer
 Abdellatif Chaouki
 Abderrahim El Meniar
 Mehdi Malakane
 Khadija Jamal

See also
 List of submissions to the 87th Academy Awards for Best Foreign Language Film
 List of Moroccan submissions for the Academy Award for Best Foreign Language Film

References

External links
 

2013 films
2013 drama films
Moroccan drama films
2010s Arabic-language films